The Kalvarayan Hills are a major range of hills situated in the Eastern Ghats of the southern Indian state of Tamil Nadu. Along with the Pachaimalai, Alavaimalai, Javadi, and Shevaroy hills, they separate the Kaveri River basin to the south from the Palar River basin to the north. The hills range in height from 2000 feet to 3000 feet and extend over an area of 1095 square kilometres.

The hills straddle a number of Tamil Nadu districts, extending northeast from the Salem District. The range serves as a boundary between the Salem and Kallakurichi districts. The Kalrayans are divided into two sections — the northern section, referred to as the Chinna ("little") Kalrayans, and the southern section, called the Periya ("big") Kalrayans. The Chinna Kalrayans average 2700 feet in height, while the Periya Kalrayans average 4000 feet.

The range as a whole is fairly smooth, with soil well-suited for plant growth. Scrub and bushes jungles reach up to 400 metres in altitude, while deciduous forests can be found between above 800 metres. Sholas, a type of high-altitude stunted evergreen forest, can be found growing on isolated plateaus. Though the forest stand is growing, due to "habitat uniqueness, human impacts and cultural tradition," conservation efforts are needed. 

There are ten waterfalls in the Kalarayan Hills and when the people come to visit during the winter season only water flow on the falls. The way to the falls is unsafe and it does not have any proper roads and it is not safe for the people. The climate is moderate highly 27 °C and lowly 19 °C. The top of the hills where the roads are like a jeep road only. In the hills being people are called tribal (Malayali). There are more than 180 villages are here.

History
About the hill tribes, it is said that warriors belonging to the ‘Karalar’ community had come from Kanchipuram and settled in Kalvarayan hills. Also, they own the majority of lands for Cultivation and Agricultural activities.

Kalvarayan hill (Kallakuruchi district) was being ruled by the following three jagirdhars (Poligars) - Sadaya Goundan, Kurumba Goundan and Arya Goundan. As per 1901 census, Sadaya Goundan had 40 villages with a population of 10,009, Kurumba Goundar had 40 villages with a population of 7,490 and Arya Goundan had 11 villages with 2,318 people. Kalvarayan Hills which is under Salem districts has two as Chinna Kalvarayan and Periya Kalvarayan Hills. Both the hills were ruled by Jagirdhars/Durai. Chinna Kalvarayan capital is Maniyara Gundam ruled by Ponnudurai ancestors and Periya Kalvarayan capital is Kovilputhur/Koilputhur by Ramasamy Durai, LasumanaDurai and their heirs, even now.

As per 2001 population Chinna Kalvarayan over 20,000 and Periya Kalvarayan 15,000 populations. The community had wedding tax, cultivation tax, registration of births and deaths, and everyone had to offer gifts to jagirdhar's families during Pongal celebrations. Till 25 June 1976 the area was "not part of India, as there was no presence of governance or any government till then". The three jagirdhars were not willing to recognise the government of India and abide by its statutes by handing over 105 villages under them. The hill was brought under the government control on 25 June 1976 by invoking slavery abolition legislation, 1963.

References

External links

Kalvarayanhills.com:  Kalvarayan Hills and Falls Blog

Hills of Tamil Nadu
Eastern Ghats
South Deccan Plateau dry deciduous forests